Barbil is a city and a Municipal Council  in the Kendujhar district (also known as Iron City) of the state of Odisha, India. The region around Barbil has one of the largest deposits of iron ore and manganese ore in the world. It is a major source of revenue generation for both the central and the state governments.

According to sources, 45% to 48% ST and SCs are living here. It is a fifth scheduled area under the constitution of India.

Geography
Barbil is fully surrounded by hills.

Climate

Demographics
According to the 2011 India census, Barbil had a population of 66,540. Males constitute 53% of the population and females 47%. Barbil has an average literacy rate of 72.18%. 16% of the population is under 6 years of age. An additional 50,000 people come to Barbil for work. According to sources, 45% to 48% ST and SCs are living here.

Languages

Odia is the official language of Barbil. Nearly 45% to 48% of tribal populations  resides in the municipality and hence many tribal languages have been spoken like HO, Santali, Bhuinya language and Sadri language.

Industry

Barbil is an industrialized town with a number of steel plants, iron ore pellet plants, ore crushers, and mines. The area is very rich in iron and manganese ore. The latest demand is for iron ore fines. The iron ore is consumed domestically and is also exported to other countries such as China. Barbil also has steel manufacturing, iron ore pellet manufacturing, and liquid oxygen production.

Transport
Barbil is connected to Howrah, Bhubaneshwar, Puri, and Tatanagar by train. Jan Shatabdi Express runs from Howrah to Barbil and one passenger train from Barbil to Tatanagar on daily basis .

Barbil is also connected to Bhubaneshwar & Puri by a daily-running Barbil-Puri Intercity Express train. Rourkela - Barbil Intercity Express (Daily) via Chakradharpur, Rajkharswan , Chaibasa Dongoaposi, Jhinkpani  at  one can extend the journey to Rourkela or even Sambalpur Vizag Chennai Alleppy, etc. towards the south and Bilaspur Nagpur Mumbai towards West and also via Keonjhar Kendujhar. Jajpur Road, Cuttack Bhubaneshwar for connecting trains. (Puri-Barbil).

Barbil is also connected to Kolkata, Kendujhar, and Bhubaneshwar by road.
Prior to January 2008, there was air service from Barbil. However, international and local flights can be connected via Netaji Subhas Airport (Dum Dum, Kolkata), and also from Biju Patnaik Airport Bhubaneshwar. The Airstrip at Barbil (Tonto) can be used for private and Chartered flights.

Barbil has multiple hotels, including Padma Inn, Hotel Prateek, Hotel Smita, Lucky India, Aadhar Hotel, Hotel Karrow, Hotel Indrapuri, and The World Pinaca.

Social activities 

Bikash Mahal is the pavilion where all the social, cultural, and national day events are organized.

There are many organizations in Barbil, like Barbil Haalchal, 'Native Voice', Prayaas, Niladri, Sambad Sahitya Ghara, Seva Group, Marwadi Yuva Manch, Sahitya Sansada, Gurudwara Singh Sabha, Barbil Bikash Parisad, N.D.C.C, Barbil Civil Society and YBCC who carry out different social events in the town.

Health

The air of Barbil is laden with dust due to mining activities and passage of mineral-laden trucks in the night through the town as no bypass roads for heavy vehicles are being constructed by the government.

In 2016, there was an outbreak of Dengue fever.

References

Cities and towns in Kendujhar district
Iron ore mining in India
Mining in Odisha